Words Unspoken may refer to:

"Words Unspoken", a song by Supertramp from their 1970 self-titled debut album
Words Unspoken, a 2008 album by Gilad Hekselman
Words Unspoken, a 2011 album by Barbara Dickson

See also
Unspoken Words (disambiguation)